Chefornak is a city in Bethel Census Area, Alaska, United States. At the 2010 census its population was 418, up from 394 in 2000.

Geography
Chefornak is located at  (60.159070, -164.269437) on the south bank of the Kinia River,  upriver from its mouth in Etolin Strait, an arm of the Bering Sea. The town is within the Yukon Delta National Wildlife Refuge.

Local geology
Located in a region where the arctic tundra meets and interacts with the Bering Sea, as well as being in a region impacted by past volcanism, Chefornak has many interesting local landmarks.

An extinct volcano, Tern Mountain, is visible in the distance to the south. Large, blocky, igneous rocks are a common sight in the village and the surrounding tundra.

The Kinia River (Urrsukvaaq) and its many tributaries are important to the people of the village, because of water travel to hunting and fishing areas, as well as because of difficulties presented by flooding and erosion.

Demographics

Chefornak first appeared on the 1950 U.S. Census as an unincorporated village. It formally incorporated in 1974.

As of the census of 2000, there were 394 people, 75 households, and 63 families residing in the city. There were 82 housing units at an average density of 14.3 per square mile (5.5/km2). The racial makeup of the city was 93.40% Alaska Native, 2.03% White, and 4.57% from two or more races.

There were 75 households, out of which 60.0% had children under the age of 18 living with them, 61.3% were married couples living together, 13.3% had a female householder with no husband present, and 16.0% were non-families. 14.7% of all households were made up of individuals, and none had someone living alone who was 65 years of age or older. The average household size was 5.25 and the average family size was 5.98.

In the city, the age distribution of the population shows 45.2% under the age of 18, 9.9% from 18 to 24, 23.9% from 25 to 44, 16.5% from 45 to 64, and 4.6% who were 65 years of age or older. The median age was 21 years. For every 100 females, there were 106.3 males. For every 100 females age 18 and over, there were 113.9 males.

The median income for a household in the city was $35,556, and the median income for a family was $36,042. Males had a median income of $15,000 versus $20,833 for females. The per capita income for the city was $8,474. About 21.3% of families and 25.1% of the population were below the poverty line, including 36.0% of those under age 18 and none of those age 65 or over.

Cultural activities
Yup'ik dancing is popular in the village. The high school has an Yup'ik Dance Team which often visits other villages for feasts and festivals. Often the village hosts a dance festival in the spring, and the large Camai-i festival in Bethel attracts many from Chefornak and the surrounding villages to display their dances and to see the dances of other regions.

Subsistence living

Many of the villagers live a subsistence lifestyle, which means that they continue to carry out the hunter-gatherer activities that their ancestors developed adapted to the local ecosystem. Important staples include fish such as halibut, salmon, and herring, which are dried and eaten like jerky. The Alaska blackfish is an important part of the local diet, and can be caught year round in the river. Residents gather berries such as salmonberries (cloudberries), black berries (crowberries), and blueberries (bog bilberries) are also gathered and used to prepare akutaq, a whipped dessert. Other native foods that are gathered include mousefood, Labrador tea, and greens such as sourdock.

Village buildings

Beside houses, public buildings in the village include:
 Chefarnrmute, Inc., the village corporation
 Avugiak's Store
 post office
 town hall/bingo hall
 school (elementary and high school are in one building)
 The Old School (formerly B.I.A. school)
 St. Catherine of Siena Catholic Church
 power plant.

Education

The Lower Kuskokwim School District operates the Chaputnguak School, an elementary school, and Amaqigciq School, a high school, which share a building.

The Chaputnguak School was named for Chaputnguak, the original name for Chefornak and a Yup'ik word referring to an object or thing obstructing a pathway. The Amaqigciq School is named after Alexie Amaqigciq, a Yup'ik elder who selected the village site and  first inhabitant of Chefornak, .

Transportation

People access the village of Chefornak primarily by small aircraft but can also reach it via snowmobile in the winter. Goods and mail are brought into the village by plane and, during the summer months, up the Kinia River by barge. Chefornak's airport has been moved further from the village due to concerns with its proximity to the school. The new airstrip has been constructed and is now in operation. Within the village, transportation options include four-wheel, bicycle, snow machine, and on foot.

Notable people 
 Paul John (1929–2015), Yup'ik elder, fisherman

References

External links
 Chaputnguak School
 Alaska Community Database

Cities in Alaska
Cities in Bethel Census Area, Alaska